James Thomas Beall Jr. (born December 7, 1951) is an American politician who served in the California State Senate from 2012–2020. A Democrat, he represented the 15th Senate District, which encompasses the South Bay and Silicon Valley.

Prior to being elected to the State Senate in 2012, Beall served as a member of the California State Assembly representing the 24th Assembly District. Before his time in the Legislature, he served as a member of the Santa Clara County Board of Supervisors, as well as a member of the San Jose City Council.

Early life and education
James Thomas Beall Jr. was born on December 7, 1952 in San Jose, California. He graduated from Bellarmine College Preparatory and San Jose State University.

Political career

Santa Clara County roles

Beall served on the Santa Clara County Board of Supervisors from 1994 until 2006, prior to which he served 14 years on the San Jose City Council. As a councilman and county supervisor, Beall served two decades on the California Metropolitan Transportation Commission, where he lobbied commissioners to select the extension of the Bay Area Rapid Transit system to San Jose as a top priority project, enabling it to eventually receive $900 million in federal funding. In the spring of 2012, Valley Transportation Authority and BART officials broke ground on the extension.

District 15 of California Senate 
In 2011, Beall announced his candidacy for the new District 15 seat of the California State Senate. He won the June 2012 primary election, finishing more than 11 percent ahead of his opponent, fellow Democrat and former Assemblyman Joe Coto, and again in the general election in November 2012, defeating Coto 57% to 42%. He officially took the position on December 3, 2012, taking the role from his predecessor Elaine Alquist (after rezoning).

In 2016, Beall was challenged by Democratic state Assemblywoman Nora Campos, who was prevented from seeking reelection by term limits. Beall won the election by a wide margin.

He served in the California State Senate as a Democrat representing the 15th Senate District, which encompasses the South Bay and Silicon Valley. He was not eligible to seek reelection in 2020 due to term limits.

In 2022, Beall ran for the Santa Clara Valley Water District board. Seeing no other candidates filed for District 4, he won unopposed.

Notes

External links
 
 Campaign Website 
 
 Join California Jim Beall

 

1952 births
Living people
County supervisors in California
Democratic Party California state senators
Democratic Party members of the California State Assembly
San Jose State University alumni
San Jose City Council members
Politicians from San Jose, California
21st-century American politicians